The Singapore Fireworks Celebrations was an annual event held in Singapore as part of its National Day celebrations.  It featured several local and foreign teams which launched fireworks displays on different nights.

History
First held in 2004 at Marina Bay, the event was initially known as the Singapore Fireworks Festival and organised by Unusual Productions.

In 2007, the festival was renamed to Singapore Fireworks Celebrations and had a new organiser Festival Square Circle. The event cost over S$1 million, and featured 130 varieties of fireworks over two days. The event was supported by the Singapore Tourism Board.

The amount of fireworks used grew in magnitude from 4,000 rounds used in 2004 to over 9,000 in 2006.

List of performances and teams
2004 (Marina Bay)
August 1, 2000 hours - 
August 8, 2030 hours - 
August 15, 2000 hours - 

2005 (Marina Bay)
August 6, 1940 hours - 
August 8, 2359 hours - 
August 14, 2000 hours - 

2006 (Marina Bay)
August 5, 2100 hours -  (Dynamic City)
August 8, 2100 hours -  (Our City of Colours)
August 11, 2100 hours -  (Nature & Mystique / Truly Malanesian)
August 12, 2100 hours -  (Celebration of Life)

2007 (Marina Bay): The World Celebrates with Singapore
 August 17, 2100 hours - Pirotecnia Igual, 
 August 18, 2100 hours - Lidu Fireworks Corporation, 

2008 (Marina Bay): The World Celebrates with Us
August 22, 2100 hours - Féérie,  (French Romance)
August 23, 2100 hours-  (Korean Fantasia)

References

External links
Former official site. Last archived 21 December 2018
National Day Festival
Singapore Fireworks Celebration 2007

Festivals in Singapore
Fireworks events in Asia
August events
2004 establishments in Singapore
Recurring events established in 2004
Annual events in Singapore
Festivals established in 2004